Santa Cruz do Xingu is a municipality in the state of Mato Grosso in the Central-West Region of Brazil.

The municipality contains the  Xingu State Park, created in 2001.

See also
List of municipalities in Mato Grosso

References

Municipalities in Mato Grosso